Duets:  Re-working the Catalogue is the 35th studio album by Northern Irish singer/songwriter Van Morrison, released on 13 March 2015 on RCA Records, a subsidiary of Sony Music. Produced by Van Morrison along with Don Was and Bob Rock, it consists of previously recorded Morrison songs, reworked as duets. Collaborators include Bobby Womack, Steve Winwood, Mark Knopfler, Taj Mahal, Mavis Staples, Michael Bublé, Natalie Cole, George Benson, Gregory Porter, Clare Teal, P.J. Proby, Joss Stone, Georgie Fame, Mick Hucknall, Chris Farlowe, and Morrison’s daughter Shana Morrison. Morrison's first album for Sony, it entered the Top 10 in six countries, including the UK.

Reception

The album scored 65 / 100 on Metacritic, based on ten reviews, indicating a generally favourable response. Mark Deming of AllMusic thought it an "honestly good album" in which the artist "has chosen duet partners with intelligence". He judged that Van Morrison's "vocals lack the power and emotional force he so easily conjured in the '70s, but his sense of phrasing is as soulful and idiosyncratic as it has ever been". While it is "a long way from a triumph, it's a solid, heartfelt work from a veteran artist who isn't about to give up the ghost." In a rave review, Rolling Stone said that the singer "unearths lost classics with all-star friends",  and "digs up deep cuts from mostly overlooked albums."

Duets debuted on Billboard 200 at No. 23, and at No. 2 on the Top Rock Albums chart, selling 21,000 copies in its first week. The album had sold 77,000 copies in the US as of August 2016.

In 2015, Morrison sold the rights to most of his catalogue to Legacy Recordings, the catalog division of Sony Music. Duets was his first album recorded following that deal.

Track listing

Personnel
Van Morrison - acoustic guitar, alto saxophone, vocals
Dave Keary - guitar, banjo
Marcel Camargo, Ryan Lerman - guitar
Paul Moore, Stanley Banks, Craig Polasko - bass
David Garfield, Alan Chang - piano
Paul Moran - Hammond organ, piano, flugelhorn, trumpet
Jean Caze, Jumaane Smith, Justin Ray - trumpet
Christopher White - tenor and baritone saxophone, tin whistle
Jacob Rodriguez - baritone saxophone
Jake Saslow, Rob Wilkerson - alto saxophone
Alistair White - trombone, euphonium 
Mark Nightingale, Joshua Brown, Nick Vayenas - trombone
Jeff Lardner, Robbie Ruggiero, Khari Parker, Marion Felder - drums
Abass Nii Dodoo, Mike Osborn, Lilliana de Los Reyes - percussion

Invited guests 
 Bobby Womack : Vocals 
 Mavis Staples : Vocals
 George Benson ; Vocals
 Joss Stone : Vocals
 P.J. Proby : Vocals 
 Clare Teal : Vocals
 Gregory Porter : Vocals
 Mick Hucknall : Vocals
 Natalie Cole : Vocals 
 Georgie Fame : Vocals
 Shana Morrison : Vocals
 Steve Winwood : Vocals
 Chris Farlowe : Vocals
 Mark Knopfler : Vocals
 Michael Bublé : Vocals
 Taj Mahal : Vocals

Charts

Weekly charts

Year-end charts

Certifications

References

Van Morrison albums
2015 albums
Albums produced by Van Morrison
Albums produced by Don Was
Albums produced by Bob Rock
RCA Records albums